In organosulfur chemistry, a 1,2-dithiole is a type of heterocycle.  The parent of this class of compounds is 1,2-dithiacyclopentene.  The anticancer drug oltipraz is a dithiole.

See also	
 Dithiolium salt

References

Dithioles